In the post-Soviet era, reduced funding has put the health system in poor condition. In 2002 Turkmenistan had 50 hospital beds per 10,000 population, less than half the number in 1996. Overall policy has targeted specialized inpatient facilities to the detriment of basic, outpatient care. Since the late 1990s, many rural facilities have closed, making care available principally in urban areas. President Niyazov’s 2005 proposal to close all hospitals outside Ashgabat intensified this trend. Physicians are poorly trained, modern medical techniques are rarely used, and medications are in short supply.  Doctors and pharmacists were required to study the works of Avicenna and tested on their knowledge of Saparmyrat Niyazov's spiritual writings, the Ruhnama. In 2004 Niyazov dismissed 15,000 medical professionals, exacerbating the shortage of personnel. In some cases, professionals have been replaced by military conscripts. Private health care is rare, as the state maintains a near monopoly. Free public health care was abolished in 2004.

Niyazov's successor, Gurbanguly Berdimuhamedow was a dentist, and took a rather more positive approach to healthcare. Money was invested to modernize the health-care sector, building gleaming new medical facilities. He initiated an annual Month of Health and Sports, which involved people throughout the country taking long walks in parks and  compulsory physical fitness classes at workplaces.  $56 million was spent on an ophthalmology complex in Ashgabat and $47 million in a traumatology centre.  The rural hospitals reopened, but they had severe shortages of the most basic medical equipment and hygiene standards were poor.  Theoretically the state-funded health insurance covers part of the cost of hospital treatment and medication in public medical facilities, but there are widespread reports of bribery and corruption.  There is an acute shortage of clinical staff and political pressure, for example discouraging from diagnoses of HIV .  There is a considerable flow of medical tourism from patients looking for more reliable health systems.

See also
 Health in Turkmenistan

References

Health in Turkmenistan